Daisy Lake is a lake in the Lake Superior drainage basin in the Unorganized North Part of Algoma District in northeastern Ontario, Canada.

There is one named inflow, Daisy Creek, at the southwest, and one unnamed creek inflow at the north. The primary outflow is also Daisy Creek, which flows via Shasta Creek, the Jackpine River and the Michipicoten River to Lake Superior.

See also
List of lakes in Ontario

References

Lakes of Algoma District